23rd BSFC Awards
December 15, 2002

Best Film: 
 The Pianist 

The 23rd Boston Society of Film Critics Awards, honoring the best in film in 2002, were given on 15 December 2002.

Winners

Best Film:
The Pianist
Runner-up: Gangs of New York
Best Actor:
Adrien Brody – The Pianist
Runner-up: Daniel Day-Lewis – Gangs of New York
Best Actress:
Maggie Gyllenhaal – Secretary
Runner-up: Julianne Moore – Far from Heaven
Best Supporting Actor:
Alan Arkin – Thirteen Conversations About One Thing
Runner-up: John C. Reilly – Chicago, Gangs of New York, The Good Girl and The Hours
Best Supporting Actress:
Toni Collette – About a Boy and The Hours
Runner-up: Catherine Zeta-Jones – Chicago
Best Director:
Roman Polanski – The Pianist
Runner-up: Martin Scorsese – Gangs of New York
Best Screenplay:
Charlie and Donald Kaufman – Adaptation.
Best Cinematography:
Edward Lachman – Far from Heaven
Best Documentary:
The Kid Stays in the Picture
Best Foreign-Language Film:
Y Tu Mamá También • Mexico/USA
Best New Filmmaker:
Peter Care – The Dangerous Lives of Altar Boys

External links
 Past Winners

References
 Boston crix key up ‘Pianist’ Variety
 BOSTON FILM CRITICS PICK `THE PIANIST' Boston Globe
 `Pianist' is tops with Boston film critics Boston Herald

2002
2002 film awards
2002 awards in the United States
2002 in Boston
December 2002 events in the United States